P&C may refer to:

 Parents and citizens associations, (Australian state school support bodies)
 Peanuts & Corn Records
 Peek & Cloppenburg, a German fashion retailer 
 P&C Foods, the former name of a food cooperative/supermarket chain owned by Penn Traffic
 P&C Stadium, the former name of NBT Bank Stadium, a baseball stadium in Syracuse, New York
 Pepper&Carrot, a libre culture webcomic fan-translated in many languages
 Property and Casualty insurance, another term to call general insurance, AKA non-life insurance